Pathshala is a South Asian Media Institute.

Pathshala may also refer to:

 Timli Sanskrit Pathshala, a school in Garhwal Himalaya
 SK Gurukul Sangeet Pathshala, a classical music school based in Kathmandu
 Damji Padamshi Pathshala, a Jainist religious teaching institution
 Ishwar Pathshala, a school in Comilla, Bangladesh
 ePathshala, a portal
 Pathshala (novel), a Nepali novel
 Pathsala, a town in India
 Pathsala railway station, the single railway station in Pathsala